The Brežice Grammar School is located in Brežice, Slovenia. It is a coeducational nondenominational state secondary general education school for students aged between 15 and 19. It prepares them for university, which they can enroll at after passing the matura (leaving exam).

Short history
The Brežice Grammar School was founded in 1942 as a lower secondary school with German as the language of instruction.

Curriculum
The school's curriculum consists of two programs: the general program and the classical program, in which one of the foreign languages is Latin. A change introduced three years ago is European classes, in which the general program incorporates the latest trends: project approach, authentic interdisciplinary learning, team teaching of foreign languages with the aim of increasing the intercultural competence of students.

The school also offers the IB Diploma Programme.

Quality of education
There are very few, if any, dropouts, and the academic performance of students is very good. This is shown annually in the results of the leaving exam. Every year, the average results of students are high above the national average, and the number of students who pass with distinction is among the highest in the country.

Notable people 
 Iztok Kapušin - soccer player, soccer coach
 Damjan Kozole - filmmaker
 Jurij Rovan - athlete, athletic coach
 Jože Toporišič - linguist

References

External links
 

Secondary schools in Slovenia
grammar school
1942 establishments in Slovenia
Educational institutions established in 1942